Brigadier-General Frank Henry Burnell-Nugent,  (5 September 1880 – 12 March 1942), born Frank Henry Nugent , was a British Army officer and an English first-class cricketer.

Family
Frank Nugent was the son of Albert Llewellyn Nugent, 3rd Baron Nugent, and Elizabeth Baltazzi. He attended Winchester College and the Royal Military College, Sandhurst. He married Ellen Burnell in 1905, and changed his surname to Burnell-Nugent in 1916. He and his wife had one child, a son.

Military career
Nugent was commissioned a second lieutenant in the Rifle Brigade (The Prince Consort's Own) on 11 November 1899, and promoted to a lieutenant (supernumerary) on 18 December 1900. He received a regular commission as a lieutenant in the 3rd battalion of his regiment in August 1902.

He fought in the Boer War, where he was wounded. He also fought in the First World War, was mentioned in dispatches and was wounded. He was awarded the DSO in 1916 and the OBE in 1919. He fought in the Iraq Rebellion in 1920, and was Brigadier of the Tientsin area, North China, between 1930 and 1933. He became a brigadier-general. He was appointed Companion, Order of the Bath (CB), in 1933.

Cricket
Nugent was a right-handed batsman who played primarily as a wicketkeeper. He made a single first-class appearance for Hampshire against Worcestershire in the 1904 County Championship. Batting at number eleven, Nugent made two ducks and claimed a single catch behind the stumps to dismiss Frederick Pearson.

Nugent died at Kingsclere, Hampshire, on 12 March 1942.

References

External links
Frank Nugent at Cricinfo
Frank Nugent at CricketArchive

1880 births
1942 deaths
People from Sherborne St John
People educated at Winchester College
English cricketers
Hampshire cricketers
British Army brigadiers
Rifle Brigade officers
British Army personnel of the Second Boer War
British Army personnel of World War I
Companions of the Order of the Bath
Companions of the Distinguished Service Order
Officers of the Order of the British Empire
People from Kingsclere
Wicket-keepers